Ivan Gavrilovich Alexandrov (1875–1936) was a Russian/Soviet engineer who played a significant role in the modernization of the Soviet Union.

Early life
Alexandrov participated in developing the GOELRO plan, and was responsible for the Dnieper Hydroelectric Station. In 1921 he headed the Regionalisation Committee of Gosplan.

From 1927 to 1930 he was the Head of the Department of Hydrology, Meteorology and Regulation of Flow at the Moscow State University of Environmental Engineering (MSUEE - :ru:Московский государственный университет природообустройства).

See also
GOELRO plan

References

1875 births
1936 deaths
Engineers from the Russian Empire
Academicians of the VASKhNIL
Full Members of the USSR Academy of Sciences
Recipients of the Order of Lenin
Recipients of the Order of the Red Banner of Labour
Economic geographers
Economists from Moscow
Engineers from Moscow
Geographers from the Russian Empire
Soviet economists
Soviet engineers

Soviet geographers
Burials at Novodevichy Cemetery